Department of Transportation v. Association of American Railroads, 575 U.S. 43 (2015), was a United States Supreme Court case in which the Court held "for purposes of determining the validity of the metrics and standards, Amtrak is a governmental entity."

Opinion of the Court
Associate Justice Anthony Kennedy authored the Opinion of the Court, remanding the case back to the United States Court of Appeals for the District of Columbia Circuit.

Associate Justice Samuel Alito authored a concurring opinion, while Associate Justice Clarence Thomas authored an opinion concurring in the judgment.

Thomas's opinion focuses on the separation of executive and legislative powers. Today, the Court has abandoned all pretense of enforcing a qualitative distinction between legislative and executive power. To the extent that the 'intelligible principle' test was ever an adequate means of enforcing that distinction, it has been decoupled from the historical understanding of the legislative and executive powers and thus does not keep executive "lawmaking" within the bounds of inherent executive discretion. He goes on to state that "Section 207 therefore violates the Constitution. Article I, §1, vests the legislative power in Congress, and Amtrak is not Congress. The procedures that §207 sets forth for enacting the metrics and standards also do not comply with bicameralism and presentment. Art. I, §7. For these reasons, the metrics and standards promulgated under this provision are invalid."

See also 

 List of United States Supreme Court cases
List of United States Supreme Court cases, volume 575
 Lebron v. National Railroad Passenger Corp.

References

External links
 

United States Supreme Court cases
United States Supreme Court cases of the Roberts Court
2015 in United States case law
Amtrak
United States nondelegation doctrine case law